Serpil Barlas (1957 – 20 February 2021) was a Turkish actress and singer.

Biography
Serpil was born in Istanbul to Kazım Polat and music soloist Aysel İpar. She began her acting and singing career in the 1960s and recorded 45 different tracks between 1976 and 1978. That year, she competed to represent Turkey in the Eurovision Song Contest, but was placed below the eventual representatives Nazar and Nilüfer. She then moved to the United States and lived there for 15 years. Upon her return to Turkey in 1993, the HIV/AIDS epidemic and the Bosnian Genocide had become central issues in the region. Alongside fellow musician , she recorded "Benim Adım İnsan", "Sahipsiz Çocuklar", and "Bosna", which aimed to give widespread publicity to these issues. From 1998 to 2001, she appeared on the  program "Serpil Barlas'la Kurdele".

Serpil Barlas died of heart failure in Beşiktaş on 20 February 2021 at the age of 64. She was buried in Feriköy Cemetery on 22 February.

Discography

Singles
Hangisi - İlk ve Son (1976)
Oldu Olanlar - Yandım Aşkınla Ben (1976)
Biricik Sevgilim - Ne Olur Ne Olmaz (1977)
Yaşamana Bak - Yaşamana Bak (Enstrümental) (1978)
Farkın Kalmadı - Sensiz Bir Hiçim (1979)
Dert Etmem Kendime - İlk Sevgilimdi O

Albums
Serpil'in Dünyası (1994)
Efkarım Tarumar (1998)

References

1957 births
2021 deaths
20th-century Turkish actresses
Turkish women singers
21st-century Turkish actresses
Actresses from Istanbul
Date of birth missing
Singers from Istanbul